The A10 is one of the major motorways in Belgium, connecting Brussels and Ostend (the Belgian coast), via Aalst, Ghent and Bruges. It is part of the European route E40.

As the oldest motorway in Belgium, construction of the motorway began in 1937.

References

Motorways in Belgium